Palabong is a village on the south-west coast of New Ireland, Papua New Guinea. It is located to the southeast of Umudu. It is located in Namatanai Rural LLG.

References

Populated places in New Ireland Province